Nelly Such (born 12 May 1992 in Békéscsaba) is a Hungarian handballer who plays for Siófok KC in right wing position.

Achievements

Nemzeti Bajnokság I:
Silver Medalist: 2012, 2013, 2014
Bronze Medalist: 2011, 2019
EHF Cup Winners' Cup:
Winner: 2011, 2012
EHF Cup:
Winner: 2019

References

External links
 Nelly Such career statistics at Worldhandball

1992 births
Living people
People from Békéscsaba
Hungarian female handball players
Siófok KC players
Sportspeople from Békés County